Maximilian Franz Joseph Cornelius Wolf (21 June 1863 – 3 October 1932) was a German astronomer and a pioneer in the field of astrophotography. He was the chairman of astronomy at the University of Heidelberg and director of the Heidelberg-Königstuhl State Observatory from 1902 until his death in 1932.

Early life 

Max Wolf was born in Heidelberg, Germany on 21 June 1863, the son of medical doctor Franz Wolf. His father encouraged an interest in science and built an observatory for his son in the garden of the family home. It is from here that Wolf was credited with his first astronomical discovery, comet 14P/Wolf, in 1884.

Life at the university 

Wolf attended his local university and, in 1888, at the age of 25, was awarded a Ph.D. by the University of Heidelberg. He spent one year of post-graduate study in Stockholm, the only significant time he would spend outside of Heidelberg in his life. He returned to the University of Heidelberg and accepted the position of privat-docent in 1890. A popular lecturer in astronomy, he declined offers of positions from other institutions. In 1902 he was appointed Chair of Astronomy and Director of the new Landessternwarte Heidelberg-Königstuhl observatory, positions he would hold until his death in 1932.

While the new observatory was being built Wolf was appointed to supervise the construction and outfitting of the astrophysics half of the observatory. He proved to be not only a capable supervisor but also a successful fundraiser. When sent to America to study the construction of the large new telescopes being built there he returned not only with telescope plans but also with a grant of $10,000 from the American philanthropist Catherine Wolfe Bruce. Wolf immediately designed and ordered a double refractor telescope from American astronomer and instrument builder John Brashear. This instrument, known as the Bruce double-astrograph, with parallel  lenses and a fast f/5 focal ratio, became the observatory's primary research telescope. Wolf also raised money for a  reflector telescope, the first for the observatory, used for spectroscopy.

In 1910 Wolf proposed to the Carl Zeiss optics firm the creation of a new instrument which would become known as the planetarium. World War I intervened before the invention could be developed, but the Carl Zeiss company resumed this project after peace was restored. The first official public showing was at the Deutsches Museum in Munich, Germany on 21 October 1923.

During his trip to America Wolf was interested in learning more about the relatively new field of astrophotography. He met the American astronomer and astrophotographer E.E. Barnard, and the two became lifelong correspondents, competitors, collaborators and friends. Wolf wrote a long obituary for Barnard upon his death in 1923.

Later life and death 

Heidelberg University became well known for astronomy under Wolf's leadership. Wolf himself was an active researcher, contributing numerous papers in many areas of astronomy up to the end of his life. He died in Heidelberg on 3 October 1932, at the age of 69. He was survived by his widow and three sons.

Comets and novae 

Wolf started his career as a comet hunter and continued to discover them throughout his life. He discovered or co-discovered several comets, including 14P/Wolf and 43P/Wolf-Harrington. Wolf won a competition with E. E. Barnard on who would be the first to observe the return of Halley's Comet (P1/Halley) in April 1910.

He discovered Nova Aquilae 1927, a classical nova.

He discovered or co-discovered four supernovae: SN 1895A (a.k.a. VW Vir), SN 1909A (a.k.a. SS UMa), SN 1920A, and, with Reinmuth, SN 1926A.

Dark nebulae 

One of the many significant contributions Wolf made was in the determination of the nature of dark nebulae. These areas of the sky, thought since William Herschel's time to be "holes in the sky", were a puzzle to astronomers of the time. In collaboration with E. E. Barnard, Wolf proved, by careful photographic analysis, that dark nebulae were huge clouds of fine opaque dust.

Star catalog 

Along with E. E. Barnard, Wolf applied astrophotography to the observation of stars. The Bruce double-astrograph was originally designed to hunt dim asteroids but it was found to be ideally suited for the study of the proper motion of low-luminosity stars using much the same technique. In 1919 Wolf published a catalog of the locations of over one thousand stars along with their measured proper motion. These stars are still commonly identified by his name and catalog number. Among the stars he discovered is Wolf 359, a dim red dwarf that was later found to be one of the nearest stars to the Solar System. He continued to add proper motion star discoveries to this catalog throughout his life, with the catalog eventually totaling over 1500 stars, many more than all of his competitors combined. These stars are significant because stars with low luminosity and high proper motion, such as Barnard's Star and Wolf 359, are usually relatively close to the Earth and thus the stars in Wolf's catalog remain popular subjects for astronomical research. The methods used by E. E. Barnard and Wolf were continued by Frank Elmore Ross and George Van Biesbroeck through the mid-20th century. Since that time photographic plates have been gradually replaced with more sensitive electronic photodetectors for astronomical surveys.

Asteroids 

In 1891, Wolf discovered his first asteroid, 323 Brucia, and named it after Catherine Wolfe Bruce. He pioneered the use of astrophotographic techniques to automate the discovery of asteroids, as opposed to older visual methods, as a result of which asteroid discovery rates sharply increased. In time-exposure photographs, asteroids appear as short streaks due to their planetary motion with respect to fixed stars. Wolf discovered 248 asteroids in his lifetime.

Among his many discoveries was 588 Achilles (the first Trojan asteroid) in 1906, as well as two other Trojans: 659 Nestor and 884 Priamus. He also discovered 887 Alinda in 1918, which is now recognized as an Earth-crossing Amor asteroid (or sometimes classified as the namesake of its own Alinda family). Wolf's then-record number of discoveries was surpassed by his pupil Karl Wilhelm Reinmuth on 24 July 1933.

List of discovered minor planets 
Source:

Awards and honors 
 Prix Jules Janssen, the highest award of the Société astronomique de France, the French astronomical society, in 1912.
 Gold Medal of the Royal Astronomical Society in 1914.
 Bruce Medal in 1930.

The lunar crater Wolf as well as the main-belt asteroids 827 Wolfiana and 1217 Maximiliana were named in his honor.

Minor planet 1152 Pawona is named after both Johann Palisa and Max Wolf, in recognition of their cooperation. The name was proposed by Swedish astronomer Bror Ansgar Asplind. Pawona is a combination of "Palisa" and "Wolf" (Pa, Wo) joined with a Latin feminine suffix.

Other astronomers named Wolf 
 Marek Wolf, a Czech astronomer who is also a discoverer of minor planets. He is credited as "M. Wolf" by the Minor Planet Center, while the discoveries by Max Wolf are credited with "M. F. Wolf".
 Charles Wolf, a French astronomer and co-discoverer of the Wolf-Rayet stars.
 German astronomers Christian Wolf and Ulrich Wolff (amateur from Berlin), as well as American astronomer Chris Wolfe have also discovered minor planets.

References

External links 

 
 The Bruce Medalists

Obituaries 
 MacPherson, Hector, Observatory 55, 355-59 (1932)
 Reynolds, J.H., MNRAS 93, 236-238 (1933)

1863 births
1932 deaths
19th-century German astronomers
Discoverers of asteroids
Discoverers of comets
Discoverers of supernovae
Scientists from Heidelberg
Heidelberg University alumni
Recipients of the Gold Medal of the Royal Astronomical Society
Foreign associates of the National Academy of Sciences
Corresponding Members of the Russian Academy of Sciences (1917–1925)
Corresponding Members of the USSR Academy of Sciences

Recipients of the Lalande Prize
20th-century German astronomers